Bukit Kepong is a 1981 Malaysian action film produced and directed by Jins Shamsuddin starring himself, A. Rahim and Hussein Abu Hassan. The film was based on the  Bukit Kepong incident in 1950. The film has won eight awards in the third Malaysia Film Festival in 1982, including Best Film.

In 2014, the film was re-edited by United Studios (a distributing and marketing company of KRU International), which had invested MYR 100,000 in restoring and improvement for high definition (HD) display resolution of the original film. It was reproduced in HD version; as Bukit Kepong Versi Digital HD a year later. For this restoration, the movie was cropped to 16/9 instead of its original academy ratio and electronic stereo widening has replaced the original mono soundtrack, thus distorting the director’s original vision. The technical works was done by Prodigital Lab (owned by KRU Malaysia).

Plot 
The story is set in 1950 during the Malayan Emergency (1948-1960) in which communist guerrillas of the Malayan National Liberation Army (MNLA) fought against the British colonial government of Malaya. The plot follows the struggle of the Federation of Malaya Police and local community in Bukit Kepong, Johor, in fighting against an MNLA assault in 1950. The battle peaked by the MNLA attack of Bukit Kepong police station where 18 policemen were attached on the dawn of 23 February 1950. The film portrays the police force as having indomitable and heroic spirits, showing them fighting a series deadly battles to defend Malaya from attacks by "communist terrorists".

Cast 
 Jins Shamsuddin as Sergeant 3493 Jamil Bin Mohd Shah
 A. Rahim as Lance Corporal 7168 Jidin Bin Omar
 Hussein Abu Hassan as Police Constable (PC) 10533 Osman Yusoff
 Yusof Haslam as PC 8600 Jaafar Bin Hassan
 Dali Abdullah as PC 7493 Mohamad Bin Jaafar
 Shamsudin Baslah as PC 7862 Abdul Kadir Bin Jusoff
 J.A. Halim as Extra Police Constable (EPC) 3475 Mohd Tap Bin Lazim
 Hisham Ihsan as Village Chief Ali Bin Mustapha
 Mohd Noor Bon as Auxiliary Police (AP) 1925 Ali Akob Bin Othman
 Harun Ibrahim as AP 2130 Samad Bin Yatim
 Jamaliah Arshad as Mariam
 Edah Ahmad as Saadiah
 Suhaina Yahya as Fatimah 
 Ayu Rahman as Pon
 Normah Alim as Arfah
 Noraini Talib as Fatimah Ya'aba
 Omar Suwita as Sa'ibun
 Norazizah Mohd Seh as Jamilah
 Ahmad Tarmizi Mad Zin as Mohd Nor
 Akhmal M.Zain as Hassan
 Norizan Hashim as Zainun
 Azizan Mokhtar as District Administration Officer
 Mike Steward as Mr Davis
 Steven Wang as Tuck Sai
 James Ling as Ling
 Norazam Zakaria as Aziz
 Mohd Rashid Md Isa as Said
 Saadah Fadzil sebagai Saibun's wife
 Zambry Samad as Saibun's son
 Embong Azizah as Saibun's mother
 Low Hwee Luang as Ah Yau's wife
 Tan Mei Ling as Mei Ling (Ah Yau's daughter)

Extra cast 
The Royal Malaysia Police (RMP) members were given the roles of extra casts in the film as:

 Members of Federation of Malaya Police, as the policemen of Bukit Kepong: 
 ACP Latifi Ahmad as PC 7645 Yusof Bin Rono
 Inspector Zainal Abidin Bin Mohd as Pagoh District Police Chief (J.J. Raj)
 Inspector Fauzy Bin Abu Bakar as EPC 3472 Ahmad Bin Khalid
 Corporal Mohd Kurdi Bin Ismail as PC 9136 Hassan Bin Othman
 Corporal Shukor Bin Daud as Marine Police Constable (MPC) 37 Abu Bakar Bin Daud
 Corporal Abdul Ghani Bin Abdul as MM 5674 Abu Bin Mohd Ali
 Corporal Abdullah Bin Jabar as AP 2127 Osman Bin Yahya
 Constable Marsat Bin Jidin as Corporal 7068 Mohd Yassin Bin Haji Abdul Wahab
 Constable Sukarman Bin Selamat as PC 3933 Hamzah Bin Ahmad
 Constable Talib Bin Janggi as EPC 3795 Jaafar Bin Arshad
 Constable Mat Saad as MPC 60 Ibrahim bin Adam
 Constable Mohd Jan Bin Katan as MPC 68 Awang bin Ali
 Constable Malek Baba as MPC 181 Basiron bin Adam
 Communist terrorists:
 Sergeant Ng Thin Hong as Lee Tuan
 Constable Chong Yun Fook as Kwan Pin
 Constable Lam Seng Lan as Wing Chan
 Constable Looi Thye Choe as Chin Siang
 Constable Seah Lai Soon as Chan Fei
 Constable Abdul Ghani Wahid as Leman
 Constable Mohd Yatim as Malay communist
 Constable Abdul Ghani Mohd Yusoff as Malay communist
 Constable Yahya Nordin as Malay communist
 Bukit Kepong villagers:
 Corporal Tham Chen Yao as Ah Yau
 Constable Lee Seng Chong as Ah Siah
 Woman Police Constable (WPC) Wong Chen Chu as Ah Siah's daughter

Crew members 
 Assistant Director – A. Rahim
 Technical Advisor – Inspector Fauzy Abu Bakar
 Technical Advisor – ACP Latifi Ahmad
 Song Converter – Inspector Abu Bakar Long
 Music Director – ACP Alias Arshad
 Film Editor – Johari Ibrahim
 Assistant Film Editor – Mariam Ibrahim
 Audio Recorder – Peter Lim
 Audio Recorder – Zulkifli Salleh
 Assistant Audio Recorder – Ahmad Tajudin
 Assistant Audio Recorder – Azmi Mohd Nor
 Cameraman – S.Mohan
 Assistant Cameraman – Ed Rizal
 Director of Art Setup & Set Designer – ACP Yusof Ariffin
 Set Designer – ACP Zakaria Mohammad

Production 
Director, producer and main actor, Jins Shamsuddin explained that this film was done based on the historical facts with the co-operation of Royal Malaysia Police (RMP) and Inspector-General of Police (IGP), Tun Mohammed Hanif Omar. He also interviewed former communist operatives who had surrendered after the Bukit Kepong police station attack incident and also Bukit Kepong villagers. Before production of the film, family members of Muhammad Indera, leader of the communist terrorists in the incident had met him and requested him not to show too much of the bad elements of Muhammad Indera.

Accolades

See also 

 Bukit Kepong incident
 Bukit Kepong
 Royal Malaysia Police
 Malayan Communist Party
 Pengkhianatan G30S/PKI, a similar movie in Indonesia

References

External links 
 

1981 films
Malay-language films
1980s war films
Malaysian war films
Malaysian action films
Malaysian historical films
Cold War films
Pacific War films
Films set in the 1950s
Films set in Malaysia
Muar District
Films about the Malayan Emergency